Miami is a city in and county seat of Ottawa County, Oklahoma, United States, founded in 1891. Lead and zinc mining were established by 1918, causing the area's economy to boom.

This area was part of Indian Territory. Miami is the capital of the federally recognized Miami Tribe of Oklahoma, after which it is named; the Modoc Tribe of Oklahoma, the Ottawa Tribe of Oklahoma, the Peoria Tribe of Indians, and the Shawnee Tribe. As of the 2020 census, the population was 12,969.

History
The city was founded in an unusual way, compared to other towns established in Indian Territory. Per the Encyclopedia of Oklahoma History and Culture "... it was settled in a business-like way by men of vision who looked into the future and saw possibilities. It didn't just grow. It was carefully planned."

W. C. Lykins petitioned the U.S. Congress to pass legislation on March 3, 1891, to establish the town. He met with Thomas F. Richardville, chief of the Miami Tribe of Oklahoma, who agreed to meet in turn with the U.S. Indian Commission and the Ottawa Tribe. 

That meeting resulted in Congress authorizing the secretary of the United States Department of the Interior to approve the townsite purchase from the Ottawa. Lykins, Richardville and Manford Pooler, chief of the Ottawa, are identified in historical accounts as "fathers of Miami." Lykins' company, the Miami Town Company, bought  of land from the Ottawa for ten dollars an acre. On June 25–26, 1891 they held an auction of lots. In 1895, Miami incorporated and had more than 800 residents.

The discovery of rich deposits of lead and zinc under Quapaw land a few miles north caused Miami to boom. In 1907, at the time of statehood, its population was 1,893. As mining increased and more mills were built, the population more than tripled to 6,802 by 1920.

US Route 66 in Oklahoma also passed through Miami. An historic section of the Route 66 roadbed is marked in Miami.

It is the capital of the Miami Tribe of Oklahoma, after which it is named; the Modoc Tribe of Oklahoma, Ottawa Tribe of Oklahoma, Peoria Tribe of Indians, and Shawnee Tribe.

Geography
Miami is located near  (36.883539, −94.876018).

Flooding 
Miami is located on the Neosho River, and was severely affected by the Great Flood of 1951. The town has flooded more than two dozen times since the 1990s, most recently during the 2019 Arkansas River floods. Town residents and neighboring Native American groups have objected to maintaining high water levels on the river at Pensacola Dam and its popular vacation area, Grand Lake, on the grounds that when water backs up downstream, it can increase Miami's flooding problems.

Demographics

As of the 2010 census, there were 13,570 people, 5,315 households, and 3,337 families residing in the city. a one percent decline from 13,704 at the 2000 census. The population density was 1,258.7 people per square mile (485.9/km). The racial makeup of the city was 68.9% white, 1.3% African American, 17.1% Native American, 0.5% Asian, 2% Pacific Islander, 2.1% from other races, and 8% from two or more races. Hispanic or Latino of any race made up 4.8% of the population.

There were 5,315 households, out of which 31.9% had children under the age of 18 living with them, 44.6% were married couples living together, 15% had a female householder with no husband present, and 36.2% were non-families. Single individuals living alone accounted for 31.9% of households and individuals 65 years of age or older living alone accounted for 14.7% of households. The average household size was 2.46 and the average family size was 3.07.

In the city, the population was spread out, with 24.7% under the age of 18, 57.1% from 18 to 64, and 18.2% who were 65 years of age or older. The median age was 35.8 years. The population was 53.2% female and 46.8% male.

The median income for a household in the city was $34,561, and the median income for a family was $42,313. Males had a median income of $32,699 versus $25,320 for females. About 14.2% of families and 19.2% of the population were below the poverty line.

In 2020, about one in four residents lived in poverty.

Government
Local government in Miami consists of an elected Mayor at-large and four councilmen representing four Wards.

 Mayor – Bless Parker
 Ward One Councilman – David Davis
 Ward Two Councilman – Doug Weston
 Ward Three Councilman – Ryan Orcutt
 Ward Four Councilman – Vicki Lewis

As of 2015, the city is represented in the Oklahoma House of Representatives by Democrat Ben Loring, and in the Oklahoma Senate by Republican Micheal Bergstrom. The city lies within Oklahoma's 2nd congressional district, represented by Markwayne Mullin since 2013.

Transportation

Pelivan Transit, owned and operated by Grand Gateway EDA & Northeast Oklahoma Tribal Transit Consortium, provides a trolley loop in Miami, as well as certain on-demand bus services.

Miami is served by Miami Regional Airport (KMIO; FAA Identifier MIO), with a  paved runway.

Coleman Theatre and historical buildings
Miami and Ottawa County, together with nearby Delaware County, Oklahoma to the south, attract numerous tourists to the state. These counties combined make up the third-largest tourism destination in the state, following only the Oklahoma City and Tulsa metropolitan areas.

Miami is home to the historic Coleman Theatre, located at 103 N. Main St.  On April 18, 1929, the 1,600-seat Coleman Theatre enjoyed a grand opening as a luxurious movie theater of the time. Designed by the Boller Bros., and built by George L. Coleman Sr. at a cost of $600,000, the Louis XV interior includes gold leaf trim, silk damask panels, stained glass panels, marble accents, a carved mahogany staircase, Wurlitzer pipe organ, decorative plaster moldings, and bronze railings. While there have been many changes to seeing movies in grand theaters, the building has been preserved and also serves as a venue for live performances. In 1959 a local non-profit community group established the Miami Little Theatre. The community theater group presents five large-scale productions on the Coleman stage every year. In 1983, the Coleman Theatre was placed on the National Register of Historical Places for Ottawa County. 

Other Miami structures are also listed on the National Register of Historical Places, including the George L. Coleman Sr. House, the Miami Marathon Oil Company Service Station, and the Miami Downtown Historic District.

Education
Public schools serving most of Miami are managed by the Miami Public Schools school district. The high school is Miami High School, whose mascot is the Wardog. The Wardog is a mascot unique to Miami and has not been adopted as a mascot by any other school in the United States.

A portion of northern Miami is within the Commerce Public Schools school district.

Northeastern Oklahoma A&M College was accredited initially in 1925 by the North Central Association of Colleges and Schools. In addition to its certificate programs, it has working relationships with other higher education institutions in the state to promote transfers of students seeking four-year college degrees. In 2015 the two-year community college had about 2,000 students.

Notable people

 Keith Anderson – musician
 David Froman – actor
 Cassie Gaines – singer
 Steve Gaines –  musician
 Moscelyne Larkin - ballerina
 Carol Littleton – film editor
 Mackenzie McKee - reality TV personality
 Charles R. Nesbitt – public servant
 Steve Owens – 1969 Heisman Trophy winner
 Moriss Taylor – singer/TV host
 Charles Banks Wilson –  artist
 Glad Robinson Youse - composer
 Keifer Thompson –  musician

Gallery

See also

 Miami Original Nine-Foot Section of Route 66 Roadbed

References

External links

 City of Miami
 Miami Little Theatre
 City of Miami Economic Development Department
 The Miami News-Record
 Miami Public Schools
 A Tour of the Historic Coleman Theater in Miami, Oklahoma

Cities in Oklahoma
Cities in Ottawa County, Oklahoma
County seats in Oklahoma
Micropolitan areas of Oklahoma
1891 establishments in Oklahoma Territory
Populated places established in 1891